Eugenia Logvinovna Lashnyukova (1891, Mogilev, Russian Empire) was an Orthodox (later the Greek-Catholic ) nun.

Biography

Lashnyukova was born in 1891 in Mogilev. In Kiev was admitted to Holy Trinity Monastery, and later was tonsured a nun. She was arrested in 1929 but released after nine months. In 1930, together with her sister Lyudmila Verevsky-Sedletskaya she joined to the Catholic Church. Lashnyukova was engaged in teaching children in his apartment taught them painting, embroidery and catechism. Arrested again in 1931, she soon after was released and continued selfless work, enjoyed great prestige among the faithful. On 9 July 1938 she was arrested for the third time. On October 29, that year, she was sentenced to five years in a labor camp, the future is unknown.

External links
 http://www.catholic.ru/modules.php?name=Encyclopedia&op=content&tid=4345

Converts to Eastern Catholicism from Eastern Orthodoxy
Former Belarusian Orthodox Christians
Belarusian Eastern Catholics
1891 births
Catholic people executed by the Soviet Union
Year of death missing
People from Mogilev